The following is the discography of Deep Purple, an English rock band.

Formed in early 1968 by Jon Lord, Ian Paice, Rod Evans, Ritchie Blackmore, and Nick Simper, Deep Purple released their debut album, Shades of Deep Purple, in July of that year.

The band has taken on many new members over the years, and Ian Paice is the last member from the original line-up still with the band. (See also List of Deep Purple band members.)

Albums

Studio albums

Live albums

Compilation albums

Extended plays

Singles
This section presents all singles released in European, US/Canadian and Japanese markets.

Notes
 1^ - "Strange Kind of Woman" was featured on "Fireball" on US/Can/JPN versions of the album.
 a^ - released in selected EU markets.
 c^ - new studio version recorded in 1988.
 d^ - UK re-release in 1980, reached No. 43. Remixed version released in 1995 reached No. 66.
 e^ - released in UK/Europe.
 f^ - UK chart entry on Music Week's Top 75.
 g^ - released in Germany.
 i^ - released as a stand-alone single in GER and NL, instead of serving as flipside to "Black Night".
 j^ - released in Japan.
 k^ - released in France.
 l^ - released in Japan and Germany.
 u^ - released in USA/Canada.

Videos

Notes

References

Discography
Discographies of British artists
Deep Purple
Heavy metal group discographies